Ajaipur is a village in Pindra Tehsil of Varanasi district in the Indian state of Uttar Pradesh. Ajaipur has its own gram panchayat by the same name as the village. The village is about 31.0 kilometers North-West of Varanasi city, 263 kilometers South-East of state capital Lucknow and 800 kilometers South-East of the national capital Delhi.

Demography
Ajaipur has a total population of 1,380 people amongst 220 families. Sex ratio of Ajaipur is 1,035 and child sex ratio is 1,220. Uttar Pradesh state average for both ratios is 912 and 902 respectively .

Transportation
Ajaipur can be accessed by road and does not have a railway station of its own. Closest railway station to this village is Khalispur railway station (8 kilometers North-East). Nearest operational airports are Varanasi airport (14 kilometers South-East) and Allahabad Airports (137 kilometers West).

See also

Pindra Tehsil
Pindra (Assembly constituency)

Notes
  All demographic data is based on 2011 Census of India.

References 

Villages in Varanasi district